Yellowstone Natural Bridge is a natural arch in Yellowstone National Park, Wyoming.

References

Yellowstone National Park
Landforms of Teton County, Wyoming
Natural arches of Wyoming